Juan Manuel Cavallo (born December 8, 1981 in La Para, Argentina) is an Argentine footballer currently playing for Alebrijes de Oaxaca in the Ascenso MX.

Career

Cavallo played for Rangers of Talca, who reached the semifinals of the Torneo Clausura 2008.
Then he became part of Cienciano of Cuzco, where he made his international debut to play in the Copa Sudamericana 2009. In 2010, he joined Albinegros de Orizaba, where he achieved an outstanding performance, in which he was one of the key pieces to helping the team reach the semifinals of the Apertura. He became the top scorer of the team and one of the top scorers of the season in Mexican football's second division.
As a result of his achievements he got the chance to sign for San Luis Fútbol Club, who participated in the Torneo Clausura 2011 and the Copa Libertadores de América.

External links

1981 births
Living people
Argentine footballers
Argentine expatriate footballers
Cienciano footballers
San Luis F.C. players
Club Necaxa footballers
Lobos BUAP footballers
Rangers de Talca footballers
Leones Negros UdeG footballers
Chilean Primera División players
Peruvian Primera División players
Liga MX players
Expatriate footballers in Chile
Expatriate footballers in Peru
Expatriate footballers in Mexico
Expatriate footballers in Indonesia
Association football forwards